Svetlana Tsys (born 1988) is a German beauty pageant titleholder crowned Miss Germany 2007.

Early life
Svetlana Tsys is the daughter of German Russian parents. She speaks German, English, and Russian.

Pageant experiences

Miss Berlin 2003
Svetlana Tsys was crowned as Miss Berlin at the age of 14 years.  She had to return the crown at the time when it was found that she had not yet reached the compulsory minimum age of 16.

Miss Germany 2007
Svetlana Tsys was crowned as Miss Germany 2007 in Hurghada on 26 January 2007.

References

External links
Official Website 

1988 births
Living people
Models from Berlin
German people of Russian descent
German beauty pageant winners
Miss International 2007 delegates